Nokhtalu (also Romanized as Nokhţalū, Nokhtalū, and Nokhtālū) is a village in Ajorluy-ye Sharqi Rural District of Nokhtalu District of Baruq County, West Azerbaijan province, Iran, and is the capital of the district. At the 2006 National Census, its population was 189 in 38 households, when it was in Baruq Rural District of the former Baruq District of Miandoab County. The following census in 2011 counted 151 people in 36 households. The latest census in 2016 showed a population of 127 people in 38 households. After the census, Baruq District was separated from Miandoab County, elevated to the status of a county, and divided into two districts.

References 

Populated places in West Azerbaijan Province